Shlomi Edri (born May 29, 1982) is an Israeli footballer who is playing for Bnei Eilat in Liga Alef.
In the 2011-2012 season he has played for the German club, Carl Zeiss Jena.

References

1982 births
Living people
Israeli footballers
Footballers from Central District (Israel)
Maccabi Herzliya F.C. players
Hapoel Petah Tikva F.C. players
Bnei Sakhnin F.C. players
Hapoel Haifa F.C. players
Maccabi Netanya F.C. players
Hapoel Rishon LeZion F.C. players
Hapoel Acre F.C. players
Maccabi Ahi Nazareth F.C. players
Maccabi Ironi Tirat HaCarmel F.C. players
Maccabi HaShikma Ramat Hen F.C. players
Hapoel Ramat Gan F.C. players
FC Carl Zeiss Jena players
Bnei Eilat F.C. players
Israeli expatriate footballers
Expatriate footballers in Germany
Israeli expatriate sportspeople in Germany
Liga Leumit players
Israeli Premier League players
Israeli people of Moroccan-Jewish descent
3. Liga players
People from Mazkeret Batya
Association football forwards